The Women's 800 metres event  at the 2009 European Athletics Indoor Championships was held on March 6–8.

Medalists

Results

Heats 
First 2 of each heat (Q) and the next 6 fastest (q) qualified for the semifinals.

Semifinals 
First 3 of each semifinals qualified directly (Q) for the final.

Final

References
Results

800 metres at the European Athletics Indoor Championships
2009 European Athletics Indoor Championships
2009 in women's athletics
International athletics competitions hosted by Italy